Sir Robert Gray Cornish Mowbray, 2nd Baronet, DL (21 May 1850 – 23 July 1916), was a British Conservative politician.

Early life
Mowbray was the eldest son of the Father of the House of Commons, Sir John Mowbray, 1st Baronet, and his wife Elizabeth Grey (née Mowbray). Among his siblings were his younger brothers, Reginald Ambrose Mowbray, later the 3rd Baronet, and the Reverend Edmund George Lionel Mowbray, later the 4th Baronet.

His paternal grandparents were Robert Stirling Cornish and the former Marianne Powning. His mother was the daughter, and sole heir, of George Isaac Mowbray of Bishopwearmouth and the former Elizabeth Gray.

He was educated at Eton College (1863–8) before graduating from Balliol College, Oxford with a Master of Arts degree in 1872. He was gazetted as a lieutenant in the part-time Royal Berkshire Militia on 1 June 1872, but he never joined the regiment for its annual training and resigned on 29 April 1874. He became a Fellow of All Souls in 1873 and a Barrister-at-law of the Inner Temple in 1876. He served as secretary of the Royal Commission on the Stock Exchange in 1876.

Career
He was elected to Parliament for Prestwich at the 1886 general election, and held the seat until his defeat at the 1895 general election. From 1887 til 1892 he was Parliamentary Private Secretary to George Goschen, Chancellor of the Exchequer. He returned to the House of Commons at an unopposed by-election in March 1900 for the Brixton constituency, and held that seat until he stood down at the 1906 general election. He lived at 'Warennes Wood' at Stratfield Mortimer in Berkshire and was appointed a deputy lieutenant of that county in 1900.

He was a member of the Royal Commission on Opium in India from 1893 to 1895, and a member of the Royal Commission on Indian Expenditure in 1896.

Personal life
Mowbray died, unmarried, in July 1916, aged 66.

References

External links 
 

 Mowbray, Sir Robert Gray Cornish (1850–1916) 2nd Baronet, barrister and politician at The National Archives

1850 births
1916 deaths
Royal Berkshire Militia officers
Baronets in the Baronetage of the United Kingdom
Conservative Party (UK) MPs for English constituencies
Deputy Lieutenants of Berkshire
UK MPs 1886–1892
UK MPs 1892–1895
UK MPs 1900–1906
People from West Berkshire District
Presidents of the Oxford Union